Abalone Point is a cape in Mendocino County, in the U.S. state of California.

References

Landforms of Mendocino County, California